The 1993–94 San Jose Sharks season saw the Sharks finish in third place in the Pacific Division with a record of 33 wins, 35 losses, and 16 ties for 82 points, clinching the eighth and final playoff spot in the Western Conference. Their 33 wins and 82 points that season were more than their win and point total in their first two seasons combined. This was the first season in which the Sharks actually played in San Jose. After playing their first two seasons at the Cow Palace, the Sharks moved into the brand new San Jose Arena.

Offseason
The Sharks selected Viktor Kozlov with their first-round pick, sixth overall.

Newly acquired forward Bob Errey, was named team captain. He replaced the retired Doug Wilson.

Regular season

The Sharks had the fewest shots on goal (2,101) out of all 26 teams during the regular season.

Season standings

Schedule and results

Playoffs
In a Conference Quarterfinals series, the Sharks met the #1 seeded Detroit Red Wings, one of the conference's favourites for a Stanley Cup championship. However, in a stunning upset, the Sharks eliminated the Red Wings in seven games. They went on to face the Toronto Maple Leafs in the Conference Semi-final, and had a 3-2 series lead. However, the Leafs won the final two games in Toronto to eliminate the Sharks and advance to the Conference Final.

Player statistics

Note: Pos = Position; GP = Games played; G = Goals; A = Assists; Pts = Points; +/- = plus/minus; PIM = Penalty minutes; PPG = Power-play goals; SHG = Short-handed goals; GWG = Game-winning goals
      MIN = Minutes played; W = Wins; L = Losses; T = Ties; GA = Goals-against; GAA = Goals-against average; SO = Shutouts; SA = Shots against; SV = Shots saved; SV% = Save percentage;

Transactions

Trades

Free agency

Waivers

Departures

Draft picks

NHL Entry Draft

NHL Supplemental Draft

NHL Expansion Draft

References
 2021–22 San Jose Sharks Media Guide
 Sharks on Hockey Database

S
S
San Jose Sharks seasons
San Jose Sharks
San Jose Sharks